The 2014 Chivas USA season was Chivas USA's tenth and final season in Major League Soccer, the top division for soccer in America.

Finishing seventh in the Western Conference, it was the club's first season since 2009 that they did not finish in last place in the Western Conference. However, the club failed to qualify for the MLS Cup Playoffs for a fifth-consecutive year. Outside of MLS play, Chivas reached the fourth round proper of the U.S. Open Cup, where they fell in penalties to the Carolina RailHawks of the second-division NASL. In the SuperClasico, Chivas finished as runners-up to inner-city rivals, LA Galaxy. The club's best performance in external competitions came in the preseason Desert Diamond Cup, where Chivas finished in second place.

Despite the poor production on the field, the bright spot on the club was young Mexican international Cubo Torres, who led the club in goals scored during the regular season, with fifteen. He finished seventh in the league in total MLS regular season goals for 2014.

Transfers

In

Out

Roster

Kits

Friendlies

Competitions

MLS

League table

Results summary

Results by round

Results

U.S. Open Cup

Squad statistics

Appearances and goals

|-
|colspan="14"|Players who left Chivas USA during the season:

|}

Goal scorers

Disciplinary record

Awards

MLS Player of the Week

MLS Goal of the Week

See also
 2014 in American soccer

References

Chivas USA seasons
Chivas USA
Chivas USA
Chivas USA